Hellström is a Swedish surname.

Geographical distribution
As of 2014, 89.1% of all known bearers of the surname Hellström were residents of Sweden (frequency 1:1,149) and 8.9% of Finland (1:6,444).

In Sweden, the frequency of the surname was higher than national average (1:1,149) in the following counties:
 1. Västernorrland County (1:499)
 2. Västmanland County (1:667)
 3. Jämtland County (1:675)
 4. Dalarna County (1:733)
 5. Södermanland County (1:757)
 6. Gävleborg County (1:767)
 7. Gotland County (1:835)
 8. Örebro County (1:932)
 9. Uppsala County (1:943)
 10. Östergötland County (1:1,086)
 11. Stockholm County (1:1,092)

In Finland, the frequency of the surname was higher than national average (1:6,444) in the following regions:
 1. Åland (1:659)
 2. Southwest Finland (1:1,987)
 3. Ostrobothnia (1:2,556)
 4. Uusimaa (1:4,124)

People
 Håkan Hellström (born 1974), Swedish musician
 Jan Hellström (born 1960), Swedish footballer
 Johan Hellström (1907–1989), Finnish boxer
 Jonathan Hellström (born 1988), Swedish footballer who plays for Gefle IF
 Kristian Hellström (1880–1946), Swedish athlete
 Lilly Hellström (1866–1930), Swedish schoolteacher and newspaper editor
 Paul Hellstrom Foster (1939–1967), United States Marine
 Ronnie Hellström (1949–2022), Swedish football player
 Sara Hjellström (born 1993), Swedish singer known as Shy Martin
 Sheila A. Hellstrom (1935–2020), Canadian general
 Thure Hellström (1857–1930), Finnish architect

References

Swedish-language surnames